Puerto Rico Highway 679 (PR-679) is a north–south road located entirely in the municipality of Dorado, Puerto Rico.

Major intersections

See also

 List of highways numbered 679

References

External links
 

679
Dorado, Puerto Rico